"All the Love in the World" is a song by industrial rock act Nine Inch Nails. It appears on the 2005 release With Teeth.

Musical structure
The song, which features Dave Grohl on percussion, begins with a "wet drum beat", as described by David Raposa of Pitchfork. Trent Reznor's vocals start off mellow, sullen and pensive and eventually go back and forth between falsetto vocals and near-shouting. Instrumentation includes piano loops and trip hop reminiscent beats.

Critical reception
David Browne of Entertainment Weekly praised the song, stating that "newfound expansiveness emerges in the glorious epic All the Love in the World, which shifts effortlessly from drum-and-bass tranquillity to acid-house beats and even finds Reznor singing in something resembling a romantic croon." David Raposa of Pitchfork interpreted the song as "a track that can easily be read as a response to his fading celebrity in the wake of the success of countless imitators." He also went on to criticize the track as "ninth-grade poetry" and "something that sounds like it would be played in an 80s goth club." Billboard ranked "All the Love in the World" as the most dramatic song on With Teeth, by specifically noting that "the remains of the overly dramatic mishmashed late 1990s sound still surface ("All the Love in the World")". Marc Spitz of Spin mentioned the song as one of "gospel-piano prettiness." Mike Schiller of The A.V. Club wrote: "despite some seriously arrested development in the lyric department, the song traverses a ton of musical ground in a slow transformation from drum’n'bass-touched slow-burn to barreling-down-the-highway “Free Bird” jam, complete with tambourines and lots of multi-tracked vocals." Thomas Inskeep of Stylus described the song as "fairly subdued" and "as mournful as Reznor gets."

Live performance
"All the Love in the World", despite being from an album released eight years prior, was first played in concert
November 5, 2013 at the AT&T Center in San Antonio, Texas and has been played regularly on later dates of the tour.

Cultural references
The song was mentioned in a book about earlier album Pretty Hate Machine written by Daphne Carr. In the book, Carr said "All the Love in the World" was one of Nine Inch Nails' deeper songs noting the lyrics "Watching all the insects march along, seem to know just right where they belong, smears of face reflecting in the chrome, hiding in the crowd I'm all alone."

References

External links

2005 songs
Nine Inch Nails songs
Songs written by Trent Reznor
Song recordings produced by Trent Reznor
Song recordings produced by Alan Moulder
Trip hop songs